Sir Charles Edward Lewis, 1st Baronet (25 December 1825 – 10 February 1893) was an English Conservative politician who sat in the House of Commons in two periods between 1872 and 1892.

Lewis was the son of Rev. George William Lewis who was minister of the Chapel of Ease at Ramsgate and his wife Caroline (née Concanen). He became a solicitor in 1847 and retired as a solicitor in 1876.

In 1872 Lewis was elected Member of Parliament for Londonderry. He held the seat until 1886. After the 1886 general election, he was unseated on petition. He  was created baronet of Brighton in the County of Sussex on 6 April 1887.  Also in 1887 he was elected MP for Antrim North  and held the seat until 1892.

Lewis died at the age of 67.

Lewis married Isabella Ellison, daughter of Richard Annesley Ellison, merchant of Bristol, in 1850.

References

External links
 

1825 births
1893 deaths
Members of the Parliament of the United Kingdom for County Antrim constituencies (1801–1922)
Members of the Parliament of the United Kingdom for County Londonderry constituencies (1801–1922)
UK MPs 1880–1885
UK MPs 1868–1874
UK MPs 1874–1880
UK MPs 1886–1892
Baronets in the Baronetage of the United Kingdom
Irish Conservative Party MPs